Miha Verlič (born 21 August 1991) is a Slovenian professional ice hockey forward currently playing for the Fischtown Pinguins of the Deutsche Eishockey Liga (DEL).

Playing career
He originally played with HDD Olimpija Ljubljana in the EBEL before joining fellow EBEL competitors, Graz 99ers on a two-year deal on 6 May 2014.

After one season with Graz, Verlič was released from the second year of his contract, and quickly signed a one-year deal as a free agent with fellow EBEL club, EC VSV on 27 April 2015.

His elder brother Jure also played the sport professionally.

International play
He represented Slovenia at the 2014 Winter Olympics in Sochi.

Career statistics

Regular season and playoffs

International

References

External links

1991 births
Living people
Fischtown Pinguins players
Graz 99ers players
JYP Jyväskylä players
HDD Olimpija Ljubljana players
Ice hockey players at the 2014 Winter Olympics
Ice hockey players at the 2018 Winter Olympics
Olympic ice hockey players of Slovenia
Slovenian ice hockey centres
Sportspeople from Maribor
EC VSV players
HDK Maribor players
HC Slezan Opava players
Slovenian expatriate ice hockey people
Slovenian expatriate sportspeople in Austria
Slovenian expatriate sportspeople in Germany
Slovenian expatriate sportspeople in Finland
Slovenian expatriate sportspeople in the Czech Republic
Expatriate ice hockey players in the Czech Republic
Expatriate ice hockey players in Germany
Expatriate ice hockey players in Finland
Expatriate ice hockey players in Austria